Cam Bergman (born January 14, 1983 in Coquitlam, British Columbia) was a Canadian lacrosse player who played for the Edmonton Rush in the National Lacrosse League. He was drafted by the Anaheim Storm in then 2003 National Lacrosse League Entry Draft.

Statistics

NLL
Reference:

References

1983 births
Living people
Canadian lacrosse players
Edmonton Rush players
Lacrosse people from British Columbia
People from Coquitlam